Alta Architects is an American architecture firm based in San Antonio, Texas. Founded in 1927 as Eickenroht & Cocke, the firm specializes in the design of major academic, K-12, healthcare, scientific and infrastructure projects. It is the largest minority-owned design and management firm in the state of Texas.

Among their latest works is designing a new $150 million courthouse in the City of San Antonio.

The founders were John Kell Sr. (1903–2002) and Bartlett Cocke. Kell's mentor was O'Neil Ford.

Awards
Alta Architects won over 158 juried design awards at the local, state and national levels for a variety of projects.

Some current and recent projects
This list includes projects in which Alta Architects collaborated with other architecture firms:

 Henry B. Gonzalez Convention Center, San Antonio, Texas
 Dolph Briscoe Jr. Library, UTHSCSA, Texas
 Northrup Hall, Trinity University, Texas (along with Robert Stern)
 Engineering and Biotechnology Building, UTSA
 University Health System Hospital
 Alice McDermott Building, CTRC, San Antonio, Texas
 Perry–Castañeda Library, UT Austin
 Our Lady of the Lake University main building, Texas
 Frost Bank main tower, Downtown San Antonio, Texas
 University of Texas at Dallas, Math, Science and Engineering Teaching-Learning Center, Dallas, Texas
 AT&T Center (along with Ellerbe Becket)
 University of Texas–Pan American Education Complex

References

External links
 
 Kell Munoz Featured on World Architecture News Magazine
 Kell Munoz Featured by Texas Society of Architects

Architecture firms based in Texas
Companies based in San Antonio
Design companies established in 1927